Phu Wua is a wildlife sanctuary in northeastern Thailand, in Bueng Kan Province. It covers an area of 186.5 km2 of the districts Seka and Bung Khla.

Features
The wildlife preserve covers forested hills along the Mekong River, ranging between 160 and 448 m elevation. The highest hill is Phu Wua Lang Tham Sung. Shorea obtusa is the most common tree. The dry and wet virgin forests are interspersed with bamboo forests and grasslands. Wildlife of the sanctuary includes elephants, tigers, leopards, bears, pheasants, monkeys, and gibbons.

The area was first surveyed in 1964, but the survey was halted due to the growing communist insurgency in the area. It took till 1974 for the forestry department to complete the survey and report the results to the government. On 2 May 1975 it was established as a wildlife sanctuary by royal decree.

References

External links
Phu Wua Wildlife Sanctuary - Elephant Watering Hole
Visit to a Forest Temple Cave in Phu Wua Wildlife Sanctuary
Elephant watching from a "tree house"

Wildlife sanctuaries of Thailand
Geography of Bueng Kan province
Protected areas established in 1975
1975 establishments in Thailand